Jørn Magdahl (born 7 April 1950) is a Norwegian politician.

He was the leader of the Red Electoral Alliance from 1995 to 1997. He was succeeded by the more profiled Aslak Sira Myhre. He resides in Skallestad.

References

1950 births
Living people
Red Party (Norway) politicians
Leaders of political parties in Norway
People from Vestfold